The Intercontinental Cup was a baseball tournament between the members of the then-International Baseball Federation (IBAF). It was first held in 1973 in Italy, and was held every other year following until 1999.

After 1999, the tournament was held every few four years—in 2002, 2006 and 2010. The tournament was dominated by Cuba which won 10 gold and 3 silver in 16 tournaments. The most recent tournament was held in 2010, in Taichung, Taiwan, and appears to have been the last time the tournament was held.

The 1973 and 1975 tourneys were organized by the IBAF splinter group FEMBA. The groups reunited in 1976 and continued to present the competition.

Results

Medal table

See also
Baseball awards#World

References

 
International baseball competitions
Recurring sporting events established in 1973
Recurring sporting events disestablished in 2011
Defunct baseball competitions